Wilder may refer to:

People
 Wilder (name), including a list of people with the name

Places

Austria
 Kaisergebirge, also called Wilder Kaiser, a ski area in Austria

United States
 Wilder, Idaho
 Wilder, Kansas
 Wilder, Kentucky
 Wilder, Minnesota
 Wilder, Tennessee
 Wilder, Vermont

The arts

Film and television
 Camp Wilder (1992–1993), an American television sitcom
 National Lampoon's Van Wilder, a 2002 comedy film

Other
 Wilder (album), a 1981 album by The Teardrop Explodes
 Wilder (Dungeons & Dragons), a character class in Dungeons & Dragons
 Wilder (The Wheel of Time), a collective term for a type of women in The Wheel of Time series by Robert Jordan

See also